State awards of Turkmenistan include the orders, decorations, and medals. The following is a list of these awards of Turkmenistan.

Types of State Awards

Highest awards
The title of "Türkmenistanyň Gahrymany" (Hero of Turkmenistan) is the highest degree of distinction of Turkmenistan and is assigned only to citizens of Turkmenistan for particularly outstanding services to the state and society.

Order
By seniority:

 Watan Order
 Order of Saparmurat Türkmenbaşy the Great
 Star of President Order
Oguzkhan Star Order
 Order of Turkmenbashi
 Order of Altyn Asyr
 Order of Garaşsyzlyk
Order of Neutrality
 Order "For the Love of Turkmenistan"
 Galkynyş Order
 Order of Ruhubelent
 Order of the Female Soul
 Order "For Contribution to the Development of Cooperation"

Medals 
 Altyn Ay Medal
 Medal "Veteran of the Armed Forces"
 Medal "Edermenlik"
 Medal "For impeccable service to the Fatherland"
 Medal "For the love of the Fatherland"
 Breastplate of Merdan Serchetchi

Anniversary medals
 Jubilee Medal "19 years of Independence of Turkmenistan"
Jubilee Medal "20 years of Independence of Turkmenistan"
Jubilee Medal "25 years of Independence of Turkmenistan"
Jubilee Medal "25 years of Neutrality of Turkmenistan" 
Jubilee Medal "60 Years of the Victory in the Great Patriotic War 1941–1945"
Jubilee Medal "75 Years of the Victory in the Great Patriotic War 1941–1945" (joint CIS award, minted in Russia and distributed by the authorities of the CIS countries) 
Jubilee Medal "30 years of Independence of Turkmenistan"

Titles 

 People's Teacher of Turkmenistan
 People's Doctor of Turkmenistan
 People's Horse Breeder of Turkmenistan
 People's Artist of Turkmenistan
 People's Artist of Turkmenistan
 People's writer of Turkmenistan
 People's Bakhshi of Turkmenistan
 Honored Worker of Science and Technology of Turkmenistan
 Honored Worker of Industry of Turkmenistan
 Honored Carpet of Turkmenistan
 Honored Builder of Turkmenistan
 Honored Architect of Turkmenistan
 Honored Worker of Transport of Turkmenistan
 Honored Communications Worker of Turkmenistan
 Honored Worker of Agriculture
 Honored Horse Breeder of Turkmenistan
 Honored Land Surveyor of Turkmenistan
 Honored Worker of Health of Turkmenistan
 Honored Worker of Culture of Turkmenistan
 Honored Artist of Turkmenistan
 Honored Bakhshi of Turkmenistan
 Honored Artist of Turkmenistan
 Honored Journalist of Turkmenistan
 Honored Worker of Education of Turkmenistan
 Honored Worker in the Field of Public Services of Turkmenistan
 Honored Lawyer of Turkmenistan
 Honored Economist of Turkmenistan
 Honored Pilot of Turkmenistan
 Honored Master of Sports of Turkmenistan
 Honored Coach of Turkmenistan
 Honorary Elder of the People of Turkmenistan
 Master of the Profession of the Golden Age of Turkmenistan
 Mother Heroine
 Master Jockey-Mentor of Turkmenistan

Former 
 People's Artist of the Turkmen SSR - It was established 28 February 1940. It was appropriated by the Presidium of the Supreme Council of the Turkmen SSR to outstanding artists who were particularly distinguished in the development of theater, music and cinema. As a rule, it was awarded no earlier than five years after the conferment of the honorary title "Honored Artist of the Turkmen SSR" It was last awarded in 1982 to Maya-Gozel Aimedova.
 Honored Artist of the Turkmen SSR - It was first awarded in 1957 was Georgy Menglet. The last person awarded this honorary title in 1986 was Khodzhakuli Narliev, the director of Turkmenfilm.

Gallery

References 

 
Turkmenistan culture